Ebenthal is a town in the district of Gänserndorf in the Austrian state of Lower Austria.

Geography
Ebenthal lies near Vienna in Lower Austria. About 40.22 percent of the municipality is forested.

References

Cities and towns in Gänserndorf District